Mazion is a surname. Notable people with the surname include:

Rodney Mazion (born 1971), American football player
Travell Mazion (1995–2020), American boxer